The Broadcasting Act 1980 (1980 c. 64) was an Act of Parliament in the United Kingdom. It was repealed by the Broadcasting Act 1981, though the provisions of the Act remained in force.

The most significant effect of the Act was to amend the Independent Broadcasting Authority Act 1973, giving the Independent Broadcasting Authority the power to provide a second television station. This began the process which would lead to the creation of Channel 4 in 1982.

It also made provision for the broadcasting of television programmes in Wales, and established the Broadcasting Complaints Commission.

It also allowed the government to take over control of the BBC in a time of national emergency.

References
Whitaker's Almanack: for the year 1982, complete edition, p. 362. J. Whitaker & Sons, London, 1981
Chronological table of the statutes; HMSO, London. 1993. 

United Kingdom Acts of Parliament 1980
Media legislation
1980 in British television
History of mass media in the United Kingdom
Broadcasting in the United Kingdom